Defending champion Björn Borg successfully defended his title, defeating Guillermo Vilas in the final 6–2, 6–3, 6–4 to win the men's singles tennis title at the
1975 French Open.

Seeds
The seeded players are listed below. Björn Borg was the champion; others show the round in which they were eliminated.

  Björn Borg (champion)
  Manuel Orantes (first round)
  Ilie Năstase (third round)
  Guillermo Vilas (final)
  Roscoe Tanner (third round)
  John Alexander (fourth round)
  Raúl Ramírez (quarterfinals)
  Harold Solomon (quarterfinals)
  Alex Metreveli (second round)
  Eddie Dibbs (semifinals)
  Jaime Fillol Sr. (fourth round)
  François Jauffret (fourth round)
  Brian Gottfried (fourth round)
  Jan Kodeš (fourth round)
  Stan Smith (fourth round)
  Onny Parun (quarterfinals)

Qualifying

Draw

Key
 Q = Qualifier
 WC = Wild card
 LL = Lucky loser
 r = Retired

Finals

Section 1

Section 2

Section 3

Section 4

Section 5

Section 6

Section 7

Section 8

External links
 Association of Tennis Professionals (ATP) – 1975 French Open Men's Singles draw
1975 French Open – Men's draws and results at the International Tennis Federation

Men's Singles
French Open by year – Men's singles
1975 Grand Prix (tennis)